The 2004 Australian Under-21 Individual Speedway Championship was the 18th running of the Australian Under-21 Individual Speedway Championship organised by Motorcycling Australia. The final took place on 31 January 2004 at the Undera Park Speedway in Undera, Victoria. The championship was won by defending champion, Adelaide's Rory Schlein. Robert Ksiezak from Adelaide was second with another South Australian, Matt Wethers, in third place.

2004 Australian Under-21 Solo Championship

Intermediate Classification
 31 January 2004
  Undera, Victoria – Undera Park Speedway
 Referee:

Final
1 Rory Schlein
2 Robert Ksiezak
3 Matt Wethers
4 Trevor Harding

Heat By Heat

References

See also
 Australia national speedway team
 Sport in Australia

Speedway in Australia
Australia
Individual Speedway Championship